Tiền Phong (meaning "Vanguard") is a Vietnamese daily newspaper. It was established during the First Indochina War as one of the first revolutionary newspapers in Vietnam, at about the same time as the predecessors of Quan Doi Nhan Dan and Nhan Dan.

Ton Duc Luong was in charge of illustrations from 1957 to 1982.

References

External links
Tien Phong Website

Newspapers published in Vietnam
Vietnamese-language newspapers
Publications with year of establishment missing